Active Records was a record sublabel of RCA Records founded in 1980. The label focused mainly on heavy metal music. The label was dissolved in 1994.

Bands
 Anacrusis
 Atheist
 Budgie
 Candlemass
 Merciless
 Destiny
 Therion

See also
 List of record labels

References
 

American record labels
Heavy metal record labels